Six Hits and a Miss was an American swing-era singing group. The group consisted of six male singers and one female (thus the word "miss" in their name has a double meaning – the converse of the word "hit", and denotation of a young woman). They performed musical numbers in several Hollywood films of the 1940s, such as Time Out for Rhythm, The Big Store, Hit Parade of 1941, and Girl Crazy.

The group was formed in Los Angeles in 1936 as a foursome, under the name Three Hits and a Miss, the members being Martha Tilton, Vince Degen, Marvin Bailey and Bill Seckler. In this configuration they appeared in the 1937 hit film Topper, singing Hoagy Carmichael's "Old Man Moon". The quartet performed on The Charlotte Greenwood Show on radio in the mid-1940s.

The group soon expanded to a septet. Members came and went, particularly due to wartime service, and included at various times Pauline Byrns, Howard Hudson, Tony Paris, Marvin Bailey, Jerry Preshaw, Lee Gotch, and Mack McLean. They were regulars on The Pepsodent Show Starring Bob Hope in the late 1930s and early 1940s, and recorded as backup singers for Judy Garland, Jimmy Durante, and Bing Crosby, whom they backed on "On the Atchison, Topeka and the Santa Fe" which reached No. 4 on the Billboard magazine chart in 1945. They reached No. 11 (another source says No. 16) on their own in 1943 with Cole Porter's "You'd Be So Nice to Come Home To".

The group shrank to Four Hits and a Miss. This configuration briefly included a young Andy Williams. Under this name, they worked with Frank Sinatra, and recorded into the late 1940s on the Decca label.

Alumni Vince Degen, Tony Paris, Howard Hudson, Pauline Byrns and Andy Williams (soon replaced by Jerry Duane) went on to form The Starlighters in 1946.

Six Hits and a Miss is also the name of a 1942 musical short in which the group appeared. Personnel at that time was Pauline Byrns, Marvin Bailey, Vince Degen, Lee Gotch, Mack McLean, Tony Paris and Bill Seckler.

References

External links  

Musical groups established in 1936
Musical groups from Los Angeles
1936 establishments in California